Bob Gleeson (17 July 1931 – 3 July 2020 ) was an Australian rules footballer who played with Richmond in the Victorian Football League (VFL).

Notes

External links 
		

2020 deaths
1931 births
Australian rules footballers from Victoria (Australia)
Richmond Football Club players